Hand-e Zamin (also Romanized as Hand-e Zamīn, Hend Zamīn, Hind Zamīn, and Khind-Zamin; also known as Mandī Zamīn) is a village in Khandan Rural District, Tarom Sofla District, Qazvin County, Qazvin Province, Iran. At the 2006 census, its population was 137, in 30 families.

References 

Populated places in Qazvin County